Tahir Mahmood Khan is a Pakistani politician who was a member of the Provincial Assembly of Balochistan, from May 2013 to May 2018.

Khan was born on 24 April 1956 in Quetta, and has a degree in Master of Arts and a degree in the Bachelors of Laws.  He was elected to the Provincial Assembly of Balochistan as a candidate of Pakistan Muslim League (N) from Constituency PB-1 Quetta-I in 2013 Pakistani general election.

References

1956 births
Balochistan MPAs 2013–2018
Living people
Pakistan Muslim League (N) politicians